The 2014 British Speedway Championship was the 54th edition of the British Speedway Championship. The Final took place on 16 June at Monmore Green in Wolverhampton, England. The Championship was won by the defending champion Tai Woffinden, who beat Craig Cook, Ben Barker and Chris Harris in the final heat. It was the second time Woffinden had won the title.

Results

Semi-Final 1 
  Sheffield
 24 April 2014

 Charles Wright replaced Adam Roynon in the final.

Semi-Final 2 
  Rye House
 30 April 2014

The Final 
  Monmore Green Stadium, Wolverhampton
 16 June 2014

See also 
 British Speedway Championship

References 

British Speedway Championship
Great Britain